Ab Darreh (also Romanized as Āb Darreh; also known as Āb Darreh-ye Abūl Qāsem and Āb Darreh-ye Abū ol Qāsem) is a village in Qaleh-ye Khvajeh Rural District, in the Central District of Andika County, Khuzestan Province, Iran. At the 2006 census, its population was 257, in 32 families.

References 

Populated places in Andika County